Joe Malachino is a former American soccer player and currently Eastern Michigan Eagles assistant coach. He played in the National Professional Soccer League, USL A-League, USL Premier Development League, and Canadian Professional Soccer League.

Playing career 
Malachino began his professional career in 1995 in the National Professional Soccer League with Detroit Rockers. During his six-year tenure with Detroit he appeared in 218 matches, and recorded 74 goals. During the summer seasons he signed with Mid-Michigan Bucks in 1997. In 1997, he signed with Cincinnati Riverhawks of the USL A-League, where he appeared in 17 matches and scored two goals. In 2000, he returned to the Michigan Bucks to serve in a player/coach capacity. During his second stint with the Bucks he made history by leading the organization to its first regular season championship. He led the Bucks to playoff finals, but lost to Chicago Sockers by a score of 1-0. For his accomplishments the league awarded him the PDL Coach of the year award.  In 2005, he signed with Windsor Border Stars of the Canadian Professional Soccer League. He helped Windsor capture the AISL Championship during the indoor season.

References 

Living people
American soccer coaches
American soccer players
Detroit Rockers players
Flint City Bucks players
Cincinnati Riverhawks players
Windsor City FC players
National Professional Soccer League (1984–2001) players
USL League Two players
A-League (1995–2004) players
Canadian Soccer League (1998–present) players
USL League Two coaches
American Indoor Soccer League players
Association football forwards
Year of birth missing (living people)